The 4th Battalion, Arkansas Infantry was an infantry Battalion of the  Confederate States Army during the American Civil War. The battalion served in the same brigade and was later consolidated with the 4th Arkansas Infantry Regiment, but units began as completely separate and unrelated organizations.

Organization
4th Infantry Battalion was organized at Little Rock, Arkansas, on November 10, 1861, with five companies, from Clark, Prairie, Pulaski and White counties. The battalion was composed of the following companies:.

 Company A, the "Bayou Metre Hornets", later renamed the "Turnbull Guards" from Pulaski County, commanded by Captain Thomas F. Murff.
 Company B, the "McKeever Guards", from Prairie County, commanded by Captain Thomas J. Payne.
 Company C, from Clark County, commanded by Captain Samuel O. Cloud.
 Company D, The "Magruder Guards", from Pulaski County, commanded by Captain F. W. Hoardly. This unit was detached to the Artillery during the engagement at Island No. 10 and became Company H, 1st Tennessee Heavy Artillery.
 Company E, from White County, commanded by Captain J. M. Moore.
 
Lieutenant Colonel Francis A. Terry, and Majors John McKay and Jesse A. Ross were in command.

On the 18th of October, 1861, a grand barbacue was held at the residence of Eylas Beals to honor Capt. Murff's company, the Bayou Metre Hornets. The company was presented with a flag by Mrs. J. R. R. Adams at this event. Mrs. Adams made the following speech at the flag presentation:
 

Capt. Murff's Reply:

Battles
The battalion was assigned to the defenses of Columbus, Kentucky, then to Island No. 10. Captain Frederick William Hoadley's Company D was detached at Island No. 10, given charge of a battery of heavy guns and reorganized as Company H, 1st Tennessee Heavy Artillery. Company D was captured at the fall of Island No. 10 on Apr. 6-7, 1862, and exchanged later that summer, where they manned the water batteries at Vicksburg with the rest of the 10th Tennessee Artillery, and were surrendered again with the Vicksburg garrison after the siege of that place.

The remainder of the battalion was stationed at Tiptonville at the time of the surrender of Island No. 10 and managed to escape by wading through the river's overflow to the transport Jeff Davis, on which they floated in the dark down to Fort Pillow, TN.  Writing from the units station at Corinth Mississippi, on May 11, 1862, Captain T. J. Payne, of Company B, wrote home describing the units condition:

The battalion was then sent to Fort Pillow, Tennessee, until after the Battle of Shiloh, when it was sent to Corinth, Mississippi, and became part Brigadier General Evander McNair's brigade of the Confederate Army of Tennessee. At Corinth, the battalion was reorganized under Maj. T.F. Murff, and participated in the Corinth Campaign from April through June of that year. McNair's brigade included the following Arkansas units, the 1st and 2nd Arkansas Mounted Rifles (dismounted), 4th and 13th Arkansas Infantry Regiments, 4th Arkansas Infantry Battalion, and Humphreys' battery of artillery. The battalion's stations as reported on the muster rolls were as follows:

31 Dec 1861 – Columbus, Kentucky.
28 Feb 1862 – Corinth, Mississippi.
30 Apr 1862 – Camp Priceville, near Tupelo, Mississippi.
30 Jun 1862 – Near Chattanooga, Tennessee.
31 Aug 1862 – Loudon, Tennessee.
31 Oct 1862 – Loudon, Tennessee.
31 Dec 1862 – Shelbyville, Tennessee.
28 Feb 1863 – Shelbyville, Tennessee.
30 Apr 1863 – Shelbyville, Tennessee.
30 Jun 1863 – Camp in the Field, near Livingston, Mississippi.
31 Aug 1863 – Meridian, Mississippi.
31 Oct 1863 – Brandon, Mississippi.

During the Kentucky Campaign, McNair's brigade was assigned to Churchill's division, under the overall command of General Kirby Smith.  General Smith pushed rapidly into the bluegrass region of Kentucky, and defeated the Union army at the Battle of Richmond. In the desperate battle that occurred there, McNair's brigade turned the enemy's right and contributed to the rout that followed.

The 4th Arkansas Battalion and 4th Arkansas Regiment operated together until after the Battle of Murfreesboro, Tennessee, on December 21, 1862, when the battalion, severely understrength because of battle losses, was consolidated into the 4th Arkansas Regiment. During the Battle of Murfreesboro, McNair's brigade took part in the brilliant charge of McCown's division, which, aided by the Divisions of Withers and Cheatham, drove the Federal right a distance of between three and four miles, bending it back upon the center, until the line was at right angles to its original position.  In accordance with Confederate Adjutant and Inspector General's Office Order Number 131, four soldiers of the battalion were recognized for courage and good conduct on the field for the Battle of Murfreesboro.

Consolidation

By late August 1863, losses had forced the consolidation of the 4th Arkansas with other depleted Arkansas regiments. The 4th was consolidated with the remnants of the 31st Arkansas Infantry Regiment and the 4th Arkansas Infantry Battalion. The survivors of the battalion served in the 4th Arkansas Infantry Regiment to the end of the war. Companies C and D of the 4th Arkansas formed one company, under the company of Captain Coatney. Companies F; G;  H; and I of the same regiment into one company, under the command of Captain Lavender.  All companies of the 31st were consolidated into two companies.  Colonel H.G. Bunn, of the 4th Arkansas commanded the consolidated regiment.

The 4th Arkansas Infantry Battalion took part in the following battles as a separate command prior to its formal consolidation with the 4th Arkansas Infantry Regiment:
 Battle of Island No. 10, April 6–7, 1862.
 Battle of Farmington, Mississippi, May 9, 1862
 Battle of Richmond, Kentucky, August 29–30, 1862
 Battle of Murfreesboro, Tennessee, December 31, 1862, to January 3, 1863
 Battle of Jackson, Mississippi, July 10, 1863.

See also 

List of Arkansas Civil War Confederate units
Arkansas in the American Civil War
Arkansas Militia in the Civil War

References

Bibliography 
 Dedmondt, Glenn "The Flags Of Civil War Arkansas", (Pelican Publishing Co., 2009). .
Gammage, Washington L., The Camp, the Bivouac, and the Battlefield, Being a History of the Fourth Arkansas Regiment, from its First Organization Down to the Present Date.
Lavender, Captain John W.  1837-1921. The War Memoirs of Captain John W. Lavender, CSA  The Southern Press, 1956. Sub title:
Lavender, John. They Never Came Back: The Story of Co. F. Fourth Arkansas Infantry, C.S.A. (Pine Bluff, AR: The Southern Press, 1956).
Reynolds, Daniel Harris and Bender, Robert P., Worthy of the Cause for Which They Fight: The Civil War Diary of Brigadier General Harris Reynolds, 1861-1865. (University of Arkansas Press, 2011), accessed at Google eBooks, https://books.google.com/books?id=H10SkwjYznkC&dq=Reynolds+arkansas+brigade&source=gbs_navlinks_s .

External links
 Battle Actions and History of the 4th Arkansas Infantry, CSA
 Arkansas Confederate Regimental Histories
  Edward G. Gerdes Civil War Home Page
 The Encyclopedia of Arkansas History and Culture
 The War of the Rebellion: a Compilation of the Official Records of the Union and Confederate Armies
 The Arkansas History Commission, State Archives, Civil War in Arkansas
 

Units and formations of the Confederate States Army from Arkansas
1865 disestablishments in Arkansas
Military units and formations disestablished in 1865
Military units and formations in Arkansas
1861 establishments in Arkansas
Military units and formations established in 1861